Sympholis is a genus of snake in the family Colubridae  that contains the sole species Sympholis lippiens. It is commonly known as the Mexican short-tail snake.

It is found in Mexico.

Description
It is a black snake with yellow horizontal stripes.

References 

Colubrids
Monotypic snake genera
Reptiles described in 1861
Reptiles of Mexico